Four ships of the Royal Navy have borne the name HMS Cuckoo, after the cuckoo, a family of birds:

 was a 4-gun schooner launched in 1806 and wrecked in 1810.
 was a wooden paddle packet launched in 1822 as the GPO vessel Cinderella. She was transferred to the navy in 1837, was used as a tug from 1861 and was sold in 1864.
 was an  iron screw gunboat launched in 1873. She became a base ship in 1912 and was renamed HMS Vivid. She was renamed HMS Vivid (Old) in 1920 and YC37 in 1923. She was sold in 1958.
She was renamed HMS Amelia in 1888 as a coastguard gunboat. She was renamed HMS Colleen in 1905, HMS Colleen Old in 1916, and HMS Emerald and then HMS Cuckoo in 1918. She was sold in 1922.

Royal Navy ship names